Jubatus is an open-source online machine learning and distributed computing framework developed at Nippon Telegraph and Telephone and Preferred Infrastructure. Its features include classification, recommendation, regression, anomaly detection and graph mining.
It supports many client languages, including C++, Java, Ruby and Python.
It uses Iterative Parameter Mixture for distributed machine learning.

Notable Features
Jubatus supports:
 Multi-classification algorithms:
 Perceptron
 Passive Aggressive
 Confidence Weighted
 Adaptive Regularization of Weight Vectors
 Normal Herd
 Recommendation algorithms using:
 Inverted index
 Minhash
 Locality-sensitive hashing
 Regression algorithms:
 Passive Aggressive
 feature extraction method for natural language:
 n-gram
 Text segmentation

References

Data mining and machine learning software